The Lost & Found is an EP record by Rasputina, the first edition of which was self-released in 2001 and the second edition, featuring two more cover songs, was released in 2003 by Instinct Records. It consists of covers of songs by Creedence Clearwater Revival, Pink Floyd, Marilyn Manson, Pat Benatar, The Velvet Underground, and Led Zeppelin, as well as a rendition of Mother Goose's nursery rhyme "This Little Piggy." The cover art and packaging was designed by artist Ryan Obermeyer.

Critical reception
Jamie Kiffel, in a review for Lollipop Magazine, said of the album, "While most of these are little more than curious novelties, there are some corpsed and dressed covers here that stand quite stiffly on their own. Melora Creager’s version of “Wish You Were Here,” with its sighing vocals, sad strings, and fuzzed-out bass effect is stunning and could frankly break into the Top 40 if the right stations acknowledge it." Joy Hepp of Phoenix New Times remarked, "Perhaps more disturbingly amusing, while CCR's classic "Bad Moon Rising" is fodder for a country hoe-down, Rasputina's version sounds like it's being performed by the house band in a bomb shelter. Creager's haunting voice and an ominous cello put a new twist on old lyrics".

1st Edition Track listing

2nd Edition Track listing

References

2003 EPs
Rasputina (band) albums
Covers EPs